Midida Shruthi is a 1992 Indian Kannada-language romance drama film directed by M. S. Rajashekar and produced by S. A. Govindaraj. The film stars Shiva Rajkumar, Sudharani, Srinath, Hema Choudhary and Vinaya Prasad. The film's plot is based on the novel of same name, written by Sai Suthe.

Cast 
 Shiva Rajkumar as Balu
 Sudharani as Sujatha
 Srinath as Sampath
 Hema Chaudhary  
 Vinaya Prasad 
 Devaraj  
 Sundar Krishna Urs as Giridhar
 Shimoga Venkatesh
 Sundarashri

Soundtrack 
The soundtrack of the film was composed by Upendra Kumar.

References

External links 

 Full movie

1992 films
1990s Kannada-language films
Indian romantic drama films
Films directed by M. S. Rajashekar
Films scored by Upendra Kumar
Films based on Indian novels
1992 romantic drama films